Germanpreet Singh (born 24 June 1996) is an Indian professional footballer who plays as a midfielder for Jamshedpur in the Indian Super League.

Career
Born in Gurdaspur, Punjab, Singh is a graduate of the AIFF Academy. He then signed for Dempo of the I-League and made his professional debut on 27 January 2015 against Sporting Goa. He came on as a 5th-minute substitute for Peter Carvalho as Dempo won 3–0. He then scored his first ever professional goal in his next match on 7 February 2015 against Royal Wahingdoh. After coming off the bench at half-time, Singh scored what would be the opening goal of the game for Dempo but the match still ended 1–1.

Chennaiyin

In 2017, Germanpreet signed from Minerva Punjab on a 3 year deal. He only made a single appearance in his first season. On 30 September 2018, he was included in the game squad for the opening match. He made a total of 11 appearances for his team before the AFC Asian Cup Break.

International
Germanpreet represented the India U19 side during the 2014 AFC U-19 Championship qualifiers in 2013. He was also selected into the preliminary squad for the India U23 side for the 2014 Asian Games.

Germanpreet made his Indian U23 debut against Uzbekistan U23 on 27 March 2015 in a 2016 AFC U-23 qualifier in the Bangabandhu National Stadium in Bangladesh.

In August 2016, he made his debut for his national team as a substitute in a game against Thailand, that India won by 4–1.

Career statistics

Club

Honours

Chennaiyin
 Indian Super League: 2017–18

India
 SAFF Championship runner-up: 2018

India U23
 South Asian Games Silver medal: 2016

References

External links 
 All India Football Federation Profile.

Super League profile

1996 births
Living people
People from Gurdaspur
Indian footballers
Dempo SC players
Association football midfielders
Footballers from Punjab, India
I-League players
India youth international footballers
2019 AFC Asian Cup players
India international footballers
RoundGlass Punjab FC players
Chennaiyin FC players
Indian Super League players
South Asian Games silver medalists for India
South Asian Games medalists in football